The Index to Marine & Lacustrine Geological Samples is a collaboration between multiple institutions and agencies that operate geological sample repositories. The purpose of the database is to help researchers locate sea floor and lakebed cores, grabs, dredges, and drill samples in their collections.

Sample material is available from participating institutions unless noted as unavailable. 

Data include basic collection and storage information. Lithology, texture, age, principal investigator, province, weathering/metamorphism, glass remarks, and descriptive comments are included for some samples. Links are provided to related data and information at the institutions and at NCEI.

Data are coded by individual institutions, several of which receive funding from the US National Science Foundation. For more information see the NSF Division of Ocean Sciences Data and Sample Policy.

The Index is endorsed by the Intergovernmental Oceanographic Commission, Committee on International Oceanographic Data and Information Exchange (IODE-XIV.2). 

The index is maintained by the National Centers for Environmental Information (NCEI), formerly the National Geophysical Data Center (NGDC), and collocated World Data Center for Geophysics, Boulder, Colorado.  NCEI is part of the National Environmental Satellite, Data and Information Service of the National Oceanic & Atmospheric Administration, U. S. Department of Commerce.

Searches and data downloads are available via a JSP and an ArcIMS interface.  Data selections can be downloaded in tab-delimited or shapefile form, depending on the interface used.  Both WMS and WFS interfaces are also available.

The Index was created in 1977 in response to a meeting of Curators of Marine Geological Samples, sponsored by the U.S. National Science Foundation.  The Curators' group continues to meet every 2–3 years.

Dataset Digital Object Identifier
DOI:10.7289/V5H41PB8

Web site
The Index to Marine and Lacustrine Geological Samples

Participating Institutions
Antarctic Research Facility, Florida State University
Geological Survey of Canada, Atlantic
BPCRC Polar Rock Repository, Ohio State University
BPCRC Sediment Repository, Ohio State University
Lamont–Doherty Earth Observatory, Columbia University
National Lacustrine Core Repository, University of Minnesota
Ocean Drilling Program/Deep Sea Drilling Project
Oregon State University, College of Ocean and Atmospheric Sciences
Scripps Institution of Oceanography
University of Rhode Island, Graduate School of Oceanography
USGS West Coast Repository
USGS East Coast Repository
Woods Hole Oceanographic Institution
Complete list of Participants

Reference
https://www.re3data.org/repository/r3d100011045
Moore, C.J. and R.E. Habermann, 2006, Core data stewardship: A long-term perspective. In, Rothwell, Guy, ed., New Techniques in Sediment Core Analysis, Geological Society of London Special Publication 267, pp. 241-251 (DOI: 10.1144/GSL.SP.2006.267.01.18).
Mix, A., Conard, B., Broda, J., Carey, S., Firth, J., Janecek, T., Lotti-Bond, R., Moore, C., Norris, R., and D. Schnurrenberger. Curators of Sea Floor and Lakebed Samples Celebrate 25 Years of Service. EOS, Vol., 84, No. 20, 20 May 2003. (DOI: 10.1029/2003EO200005) 
Moore, C. J., Curators of Marine Geological Samples Gather at NGDC; Twenty years of cooperation results in worldwide access to global ocean floor samples, Earth System Monitor, Vol. 6, No. 4, June, 1996.
Potter, C.J., 1979, Marine Geological Data and the Core Curators' File, EDIS Magazine.

Geology literature
Oceanography
Marine geology